The Luzerne County Fresh Air Camp, also known as the Ferrwood Music Camp, is an historic fresh air camp which is located in Butler Township, Luzerne County, Pennsylvania. 

The camp was added to the National Register of Historic Places in 2004.

History and architectural features
The historic buildings and structure are a dormitory (1927), dining room / kitchen (c. 1935), and wood frame pump house (1927). It originally operated as a camp for undernourished children predisposed to tuberculosis.  

The Ferrwood Music Camp, operated by the Greater Hazleton Philharmonic Society, opened in 1969. The camp is currently run by the CAN DO Community Foundation.

The camp was added to the National Register of Historic Places in 2004.

References

External links
Ferrwood Music Camp website

Buildings and structures on the National Register of Historic Places in Pennsylvania
Buildings and structures in Luzerne County, Pennsylvania
National Register of Historic Places in Luzerne County, Pennsylvania
Temporary populated places on the National Register of Historic Places
1927 establishments in Pennsylvania